Kazimierz Gawlikowski is a former Polish slalom canoeist who competed from the late 1970s to the late 1980s. He won a bronze medal in the K-1 team event at the 1977 ICF Canoe Slalom World Championships in Spittal.

References

External links 
 Kazimierz GAWLIKOWSKI at CanoeSlalom.net

Polish male canoeists
Living people
Year of birth missing (living people)
Place of birth missing (living people)
Medalists at the ICF Canoe Slalom World Championships